LeRoy Stewart Leonard (January 19, 1931 – September 4, 2014) was an American radio personality, best known for hosting WGN's midday radio show from Chicago for 31 years and for his appearances on WGN-TV's news and Christmas specials.  He also hosted Family Classics after Frazier Thomas died.

Leonard died on September 4, 2014, at a hospital in Evanston, Illinois, of complications from an esophageal infection, aged 83.

Further reading

References

External links
 

American radio DJs
Chicago Bears announcers
Chicago Bulls announcers
Chicago Cubs announcers
National Basketball Association broadcasters
North American Soccer League (1968–1984) commentators
Radio personalities from Chicago
People from Redwood Falls, Minnesota
1931 births
2014 deaths